Credo is the eighth studio album by American singer Jennifer Rush. It was released by EMI Records on March 24, 1997. Rush worked with gospel and African choirs on the album who backed her on three of the tracks. Chiefly produced by Nick Patrick (record producer), eight of the eleven songs on Credo are cover versions, with two original songs co-written by Rush. Notable songs featured on the album are renditions of Cheap Trick's "The Flame" (1988) and "The Places You Find Love," originally recorded by Barbra Streisand in 1988 and then by Quincy Jones for his 1989 Back on the Block album, as well as a cover of John Farnham's 1987 Australian hit "A Touch of Paradise."

The album did enter the charts in her most loyal market, Germany, where it reached number 26 on the German Albums Chart. This was followed by "Sweet Thing," one of the few uptempo songs on the album, while "Piano in the Dark," a cover of the Brenda Russell song, was released as a promo-only single after this. Like her previous two albums, Credo went unreleased in the United Kingdom and the United States.

Track listing

Charts

References

External links 

1997 albums
Jennifer Rush albums
EMI Records albums
Albums produced by Nick Patrick (record producer)